Derek Hudson (born 1 February 1936) is a Botswana sailor. He competed in the Finn event at the 1984 Summer Olympics.

References

External links
 

1936 births
Living people
Botswana male sailors (sport)
Olympic sailors of Botswana
Sailors at the 1984 Summer Olympics – Finn
Place of birth missing (living people)